Mahabako is a town and commune in Madagascar. It belongs to the district of Manakara, which is a part of Vatovavy-Fitovinany Region. The population of the commune was estimated to be approximately 10,000 in 2001 commune census.

Primary and junior level secondary education are available in town. Farming and raising livestock provides employment for 40% and 40% of the working population. The most important crops are coffee and rice, while other important agricultural products are bananas and cassava. Industry and services provide employment for 5% and 15% of the population, respectively.

Geography
It lies at the Faraony River and at the Fianarantsoa-Côte Est railway that links the town with Fianarantsoa and Manakara.

References and notes 

Populated places in Vatovavy-Fitovinany